The Metropolitan Manila Development Authority (MMDA) is a government agency of the Philippines responsible for constituting the regional government of Metro Manila, comprising the capital city of Manila, the cities of Quezon City, Caloocan, Pasay, Mandaluyong, Makati, Pasig, Marikina, Muntinlupa, Las Piñas, Parañaque, Valenzuela, Malabon, Taguig, Navotas and San Juan, and the municipality of Pateros.

The MMDA is under the direct supervision of the Office of the President of the Philippines. It performs planning, monitoring and coordinative functions, and in the process exercises regulatory and supervisory authority over the delivery of metro-wide services within Metro Manila without diminution of the autonomy of the local government units concerning purely local matters.

The agency is headed by a chairman, who is appointed by, and continues to hold office at the discretion of, the President of the Philippines. The chairman is vested with the rank, rights, privileges, disqualifications, and prohibitions of a cabinet member.

History

Establishment of Metro Manila

On November 7, 1975, President Ferdinand Marcos issued Presidential Decree No. 824 creating Metro Manila and its managing public corporation, the Metropolitan Manila Commission (MMC) after the residents of the affected cities and municipalities approved the creation of Metro Manila in a referendum held on February 27, 1975. The move consolidated the Philippine capital Manila and adjacent Quezon City with two cities and twelve municipalities of the province of Rizal and one municipality of the province of Bulacan into Metro Manila and designated Metro Manila as the capital of the Philippines. Marcos appointed his wife, First Lady Imelda Marcos, as governor and Ismael Mathay Jr. as vice governor. The office was located in front of the present-day GMA Network at EDSA corner Timog Avenue in Diliman, Quezon City. November 7, thus, is marked as the anniversary of both the region and the government body that supervises it, the MMDA.

On May 29, 1976, President Ferdinand Marcos issued Presidential Decree No. 940, restoring the City of Manila as the capital city of the Philippines, and designating Metro Manila as the permanent seat of national government.

The MMC became effectively defunct when on January 9, 1990, President Corazon Aquino issued Executive Order No. 392, in accordance to Article 18, Section 8 of the 1987 Philippine Constitution which replaced the commission with the Metropolitan Manila Authority (MMA). The Metro Manila mayors will choose from themselves as chairman. Jejomar Binay of the municipality of Makati served as its first chairman. The agency transferred to its office at the intersection of Epifanio de los Santos Avenue (EDSA) and Orense Street in Guadalupe Nuevo, Makati. Binay was followed by Ignacio Bunye of the municipality of Muntinlupa in 1991, Ismael Mathay Jr. of Quezon City in 1992 then Prospero Oreta of the municipality of Malabon in 1994.

Since the elected chairman is one of the mayors of Metro Manila, the role to their constituency gave less attention. Thus, the Congress of the Philippines, composed of the Senate and the House of Representatives, passed Republic Act No. 7924 creating the Metropolitan Manila Development Authority (MMDA) on March 1, 1995. President Fidel V. Ramos appointed former Malabon mayor Prospero Oreta, who did not run in the Malabon municipal election, as the first Chairman of the MMDA in May 1995 and made him independent of the Metro Manila mayors.

Current developments
In August 2017, the MMDA has adopted the use of a black beret in order to improve its public image. The berets are used by the traffic enforcers under the agency, which alternate these with a black baseball cap.

On May 23, 2022, President Rodrigo Duterte inaugurated the new headquarters of the MMDA at the intersection of Doña Julia Vargas Avenue and Molave Street in Ugong, Pasig. The building was initially conceptualized by a collaboration between former MMDA Chairman Danilo Lim and the Makati chapter of the United Architects of the Philippines in 2018, with the conceptual design being done by architect Daryl Van Abaygar and was constructed by the Robinsons Land Corporation.

Metro Manila Council

The governing board and policy making body of the MMDA is the Metro Manila Council, composed of the mayors of the cities and municipalities.

The heads of the Department of Transportation (DOTr), Department of Public Works and Highways (DPWH), Department of Tourism (DOT), Department of Budget and Management (DBM), Department of Human Settlements and Urban Development (DHSUD), and Philippine National Police (PNP) or their duly authorized representatives, attend meetings of the council as non-voting members.

The council is the policy-making body of the MMDA.

 It approves metro-wide plans, programs and projects and issues rules, regulations and resolutions deemed necessary by the MMDA.
 It may increase the rate of the allowances and per diems of the members of the council to be effective during the term of the succeeding Council. It fixes the compensation of the officers and personnel of the MMDA, and approves the annual budget thereof for submission to the Department of Budget and Management (DBM).
 It promulgates rules and regulations and sets policies and standards for metro-wide application governing the delivery of basic services, prescribes and collects service and regulatory fees, and imposes and collects fines and penalties.

Agency chairpersons

Current Metro Manila Council members

The council consists of voting and non-voting members. Voting members are the mayors of the localities in Metro Manila, as well as the Presidents of the Metro Manila Vice Mayors League and the Metro Manila Councilors League. Non-voting members are representatives by the following who serve as council members ex-officio:

Department of Budget and Management
Department of Tourism
Department of Transportation
Department of Public Works and Highways
Department of Human Settlements and Urban Development
and the Philippine National Police National Capital Region Police Office

Transport and traffic management

MMDA Media Stations
MMDA had TV and radio stations sometimes carrying the same brand, MMDA Teleradyo. They ceased on August 17, 2010.
MMDA Traffic Radio 1206 - Traffic updates can be heard on this station. It was started as a test broadcast on September 24, 2007.
MMDA TV - Traffic updates are Live Feed by Monitoring Cameras Along the streets of Metro Manila with simulcast over MMDA Traffic Radio 1206. It was started as a test broadcast on August 20, 2008.

To compensate for the closure of these communication mediums, the MMDA turned to social media such as Twitter to broadcast traffic updates to users following them. Live billboards, particularly at EDSA, have been also constructed. The MMDA app for iOS and Android have also been made available for free, broadcasting traffic updates directly.

Pasig River Ferry

Since 2014, the agency took over the mothballed Pasig River ferry system in anticipation of huge traffic along the metropolis, from the Skyway Stage 3 construction. In reviving the defunct transportation, many of the old ferry stations were reactivated and new vessels purchased. Ridership of the waterway service increased over time, with the offering of discounts to students and senior citizens. The MMDA intends to continue operating the ferry service until a private investor takes over.

No Physical Contact Policy

Since 2003, the MMDA has implemented a No Contact Apprehension Policy in apprehending traffic violators in Metro Manila using traffic enforcement cameras and closed-circuit television to capture violators without the presence of an on-site traffic enforcer.

Mabuhay Lanes
Coined by Francis Tolentino, Mabuhay Lanes (formerly called Christmas Lanes, as it was launched during Christmas season of 2014) are roads marked as priority alternative routes that must be cleared of obstruction at all times. This was underscored by strict parking restrictions, where parked vehicles along roads designated as such were towed right away.

Illegal Parking and Towing
The MMDA is tasked to clear obstructions from the roads at all times, and conducts daily clearing operations against stalled and illegally parked vehicles, with subcontracted towing companies. Illegally parked vehicles will be given 5 minutes to leave, and will be towed otherwise. Incapacitated vehicles are almost immediately towed to clear traffic.

Primary and secondary roads, unless with designated parking areas, are considered "No-Parking-Zones".

Footbridges

Starting from Bayani Fernando's term, there has been a large increase in construction of footbridges all over Metro Manila. It has been continued, albeit fewer than before, by succeeding chairmen. It has been hailed due to providing safe passage and crossing for pedestrians in otherwise risky pedestrian lanes, while also criticized for not being accessible to people with disabilities (PWDs), posing dangers to pedestrians with steep steps, slippery surfaces, and poor lighting, and prioritizing motor vehicle travel speeds over the convenience and safety of pedestrians.

U-Turn Slots
While already in existence long ago and is not a new concept, it was made popular by Bayani Fernando as a solution to worsening traffic in Metro Manila by closing certain intersections and create U-Turn slots meters away from the former intersection to create continuous traffic, mitigating bottlenecks caused by traffic light signals. This produced mixed results as there were improvements and deterioration in certain areas. During Tolentino's and Carlos' term, some intersections reverted to signalized open intersections only to reimplement U-Turn slots later on.

Public Urinals
A short-lived curiosity all around Metro Manila is the pink urinals made popular by Bayani Fernando, which he implemented prominently in Marikina in an effort to curb public urination.  They have since been removed, however, with remaining urinal units distributed instead to local government units.

Flood control and sewerage management

Pumping Stations
The MMDA operates several pumping stations in strategic areas of Metro Manila, with the aim of mitigating flooding risks, particularly during inclement weather. Old pumping stations that used diesel engines were upgraded in 2015 to use electric motors. Brand new pumping stations were also constructed in flood-prone areas as part of the agency's flood-mitigation program. In addition they also scheduled a regular maintenance of 54 pumping stations across the country with 12 stations being equipped with new pumps.

Waterway dredging
Starting with Bayani Fernando's tenure, the Estero Blitz (Waterway Blitz) became an annual waterway clearing operation with emphasis on river dredging activities, particularly at flood-prone areas, to reduce the risk and impact of flooding all over the metropolis. The clearing operation is usually conducted during the dry summer season.

Urban renewal, zoning, and land use planning, and shelter services

Gwapotel

The Gwapotel Inn is a cheap hotel run by the Metropolitan Manila Development Authority. A second Gwapotel was announced in December, 2007.

The Gwapotel along Roxas Boulevard is renamed the MMDA Workers Inn, and operated until 2017. It was closed due to deteriorating structure and will be rehabilitated/transferred at an unspecified date. The Abad Santos Gwapotel has since been converted into their training barracks.

Health

Anti-smoking campaign
The Court of Appeals says the MMDA is not among the government agencies deputized to implement RA 9211 or the Tobacco Regulation Act of 2003. The CA added that the MMDA has no police or legislative power to implement the law. It declared invalid MMDA Resolution No. 11-19, which the agency used as basis to implement its anti-smoking campaign.

Public safety
A first metro-wide earthquake drill was conducted on July 30, 2015, to prepare the public in the event of a magnitude 7.2 earthquake. Various government agencies, educational institutions and the private sector participated in the drill spearheaded by the Metropolitan Manila Development Authority (MMDA). Different scenarios were re-enacted to simulate a destructive earthquake that is expected to happen when the 100-kilometer West Valley Fault moves. Buoyed by its success the MMDA has since hosted annual regional drills for the capital.

Criticisms
In the past, such practices were justified by rhetoric that street children need to be 'rescued' from the street. Advocacy groups contend that in seeking to create a beautiful metropolis, the MMDA often treat Metro Manila's urban poor like 'rubbish' on the street.

A report from PREDA that was funded by UNICEF, claims inhumane proceedings to caught vagrants.

Kamuning footbridge controversy
The project's contractor was the BF Corporation, owned by former MMDA chairman Bayani Fernando. and was stated to cost around  million.

On October 31, 2018, the footbridge went viral on social media due to its perceived tall height and steepness as it crossed over the MRT-3's tracks, The issue also drew attention to other tall footbridges along EDSA in Cubao and Magallanes, as well as a footbridge along Commonwealth Avenue that crosses over the MRT Line 7 at its intersection with Central Avenue as compared to the footbridge in the Kamuning area, these were not only much shorter in height but also wider and made out of cement.

In a statement, the MMDA defended the design, with MMDA General Manager Jojo Garcia claiming that the footbridge is meant to deter people from jaywalking across EDSA by giving "healthy" people an option to cross EDSA there instead of at the nearby Kamuning intersection. Garcia also suggested that the addition of elevators and escalators to remedy the steepness, but cites that there is no budget for it yet. The MMDA clarified that the height of the footbridge was designed to conform to the  vertical clearance from the at-grade MRT-3's overhead catenary wires on the EDSA median. The MMDA also defended its frequent use of steel materials for footbridges, stating that it makes construction "easier" and cuts down on construction costs.

Later in November, the footbridge was slightly redesigned to include an additional landing to remedy the steepness of the steps. The footbridge was later opened to the public on November 27.

The footbridge received attention again in June 2022 after the consul general of the Netherlands in San Francisco, Dirk Janssen, tweeted an old image of the footbridge on June 25, 2022, stating in Spanish that the footbridge shows "no better way to make it clear to pedestrians that they don't matter." As the tweet went viral, he called out policymakers in the Philippines for being "heartless" and having "no regard for pedestrian and commuter rights, much less for human rights".

See also
 Department of Transportation
 Department of Public Works and Highways
 Department of Tourism
 Department of Budget and Management
 Department of Public Works and Highways
 Department of Human Settlements and Urban Development
 Philippine National Police
 Metro Manila
 Office of the President
 Pasig river rehabilitation
 Metro Manila Dream Plan

Notes

References

External links
Metropolitan Manila Development Authority

Government in Metro Manila
History of Metro Manila
Government agencies under the Office of the President of the Philippines
Urban development authorities
Government agencies established in 1975
Law enforcement in Metro Manila